Wild Water Kingdom is the second solo mixtape by American rapper Heems. It was released on Heems' own Greedhead Music label on November 14, 2012.

Background
Wild Water Kingdom features production from Harry Fraud, Keyboard Kid, Crookers, Beautiful Lou, Le1f, and Lushlife. Guests on Wild Water Kingdom include Childish Gambino and Lakutis. Heems contrasted the style of Wild Water Kingdom with that of Nehru Jackets, noting that on Nehru Jackets, "the beats were aggressive and the bars were laid back. This time, the beats are a little laid back and the bars are aggressive."

Critical reception

At Metacritic, which assigns a weighted average score out of 100 to reviews from mainstream critics, Wild Water Kingdom received an average score of 71, based on 6 reviews, indicating "generally favorable reviews".

Jonah Bromwich of Pitchfork stated that "Wild Water Kingdom is the most substantial solo project full-length associated with Das Racist to date, because it merges the academic underpinnings of Heems' ideas with thoroughly listenable rap music."

Track listing

References

External links
 

2012 mixtape albums
Heems albums
Greedhead Music albums
Albums produced by Harry Fraud